Nina Clarkin is a British polo player.

Early life
Carina Vestey was born circa 1983. Her father, Mark Vestey, (b. 1943, d. 2016)  was a former polo player. Her mother, Rose Vestey, is the Master of the Cotswold Hunt. Her paternal uncle is Samuel Vestey, 3rd Baron Vestey. She has a brother, Ben, and a sister, Tamara. She grew up at Foxcote Manor in Foxcote, Gloucestershire, in the Cotswolds.

She was educated at The Cheltenham Ladies' College in Cheltenham. She graduated from the University of the West of England, where she received a Bachelor of Arts degree in English. Clarkin is distantly related to actor Tom Hiddleston.

Career
She worked for Sotheby's in New York City.

Polo
Nina Clarkin is a polo player with a polo handicap (outdoor) currently at 4 goals.

She is credited in the introduction of Ladies Handicaps for the British Hurlingham Polo Association where she currently has the highest Hurlingham Women's handicap of 10.

In 2003, she won the Cowdray Park Gold Cup on the Hindon Polo Team, defeating the Labegorce Polo Team.

Personal life
She is married to John Paul Clarkin, a polo player from New Zealand.

References

Living people
Alumni of the University of the West of England, Bristol
English polo players
Year of birth missing (living people)